The 2008 Asian Judo Championships were held in Jeju City, South Korea from 26 April to 27 April 2008.

Medal summary

Men

Women

Medal table

References
Results

External links
 
 Result of the Asian Judo Championships (Judo Union of Asia)

Asian Championships
Asian Judo Championships
Asian Judo Championships
Judo 2008
Judo competitions in South Korea